Icimauna is a genus of longhorn beetles of the subfamily Lamiinae, containing the following species:

 Icimauna angaba Martins & Galileo, 1991
 Icimauna aysa Martins & Galileo, 1991
 Icimauna ciliaris (Klug, 1825)
 Icimauna macilenta (Bates, 1881)
 Icimauna pallidipennis Martins & Galileo, 2007
 Icimauna reversa (Bates, 1881)
 Icimauna sarauaia Martins & Galileo, 1991

References

Hemilophini